The 2019 Eschborn–Frankfurt was a road cycling one-day race that took place on 1 May 2019 in Germany. It was the 58th edition of Eschborn–Frankfurt and the 22nd event of the 2019 UCI World Tour. It was won in the sprint by Pascal Ackermann.

Teams
In total, twenty-two teams start the race. Each team delivered seven riders.

Result

References

Eschborn-Frankfurt
Eschborn-Frankfurt
Eschborn-Frankfurt
Eschborn-Frankfurt – Rund um den Finanzplatz